Every player to captain the South Africa national rugby union team (the Springboks) in a test match is listed here. Captains are listed in chronological order of their first match as captain.

H.H. Castens captained South Africa on 30 July 1891 in their first ever test against the touring British Isles team at Crusaders Cricket Ground in Port Elizabeth. John Smit holds the record as the most capped captain in international rugby history.

Notes 
1  Theo Pienaar was selected as captain for the tour but never played. He is listed as captain number 13 by the South African Rugby Annual, the official yearbook of the South African Rugby Union.
2  Felix and Morné du Plessis are the only father-son combination who captained South Africa.
3  Victor Matfield returned as captain in June 2014 after Jean de Villiers was injured.

References

Captains